Berchemiella is a genus of plants in the family Rhamnaceae.  It includes two species, one found in China and another in Japan.

Rhamnaceae
Rhamnaceae genera